My Science Project is a 1985 American teen science fiction comedy film directed by Jonathan R. Betuel. It followed on heels of other teen sci-fi/comedy films released the same year, such as Back to the Future, Real Genius, and Weird Science, though it did not perform as well as those films.

Plot 
In 1957, the United States military secures a crashed UFO in a hangar bay. President Dwight D. Eisenhower (Robert Beer) enters to see the craft and simply orders his men to "get rid of it".

In 1985, a high school senior named Michael Harlan (John Stockwell), whose only interest is muscle cars, reluctantly searches for something to turn in for his science class project final. While on what his bookworm friend Ellie Sawyer (Danielle von Zerneck) thinks is a date, Michael breaks into a government aircraft boneyard and stumbles upon a hidden fallout shelter. There, he finds a glowing, plasma globe-like piece of scientific equipment and grabs it just as a military guard approaches and chases him away.

The next day, Michael cleans up the device in auto shop class and unwittingly activates it, causing it to leech power from a nearby boombox. His friend, Vince Latello (Fisher Stevens), tries to talk him out of attaching the device to an automotive battery, whereupon the device emits a swirl of colorful energy that manifests into an Ancient Greek vase as the battery melts. The two leave the auto shop for their next class, but soon realize they inexplicably lost two hours of time and missed their final science exam.

After more strange occurrences with the machine, Michael takes the device, referred to as "the gizmo", to his ex-hippie science teacher Dr. Roberts (Dennis Hopper). Believing it is a portal to another dimension, he plugs it into an electrical outlet. While bathing in the cosmic energy of the gizmo and contemplating the wonders of the universe, Roberts suddenly disappears, leaving behind his peace symbol medallion. Michael is unable to disconnect the machine from the outlet and decides his only solution is to destroy the power lines leading to town.

Michael and Vince obtain dynamite from the backroom of a hardware store owned by Michael's father (Barry Corbin), and race to outrun a wave of energy traveling along the lines before it reaches the local power plant. They blow up a tower, stopping the wave and causing a blackout, but upon returning to town are arrested for Dr. Roberts' disappearance. Michael calls Ellie and asks her to go to the school to retrieve the gizmo, hoping to prove his innocence by showing it to the police. At the school, she runs into Sherman (Raphael Sbarge), an obnoxious nerd, who hooks the gizmo up to the outlet again, creating a massive time warp over the school and causing a blackout in town, allowing Vince and Michael to escape the police. Returning to the school, they find the whole building consumed in a vortex of space/time as objects and people from the past and future manifest around them and a crazed Sherman, who fears the world is ending and tells them that Ellie is in danger.

Dragging Sherman along, Mike and Vince grab weapons from a platoon of fallen Vietnam War soldiers and make their way to the science lab, battling a T-rex in the gymnasium and a mob of post-apocalypse mutants along the way. They reach Ellie and successfully deactivate the gizmo, causing time to return to normal just as emergency crews and police show up. Moments later, Dr. Roberts reappears, rejoicing in an unexpected trip to Woodstock, and proudly gives Michael an "A" grade on his science project under the condition that he gets rid of the machine, saying it's not something mankind is ready for. Roberts is then arrested by the local sheriff (Richard Masur), who thinks he blew up the power lines - as Michael had accidentally left Robert's peace medallion at the hardware store.

As promised, Michael returns the gizmo back to the junkyard where he found it. On the way back, the car runs out of gas and he and Ellie leave it by the side of the road; in contrast to his previous devotion to it, he says "It's just a car."

International release 
The distributors of the movie in Sweden thought it should be marketed as a mix of Ghostbusters and Back to the Future. It was subsequently renamed TimeBusters.

Reception 
The film holds a rating of 11% on Rotten Tomatoes, based on 9 reviews. 
New York Times critic Stephen Holden wrote on August 10, 1985; "My Science Project is a cheerful teen-age adventure film that in its snappier moments resembles a far less clever and less expensive Back to the Future. Despite a plot that has few interesting twists and a shoestring budget, the film glimmers with moments of drollery."

Box office 
The film was not a success. On its first weekend, it only peaked at #14 with $1,504,118, averaging $1,499 per theater. It ended grossing $4,122,748 in domestic box-office in its two-week run.

References

External links 

 
 

1985 films
1985 action films
1985 comedy films
1985 directorial debut films
1980s action comedy films
1980s adventure comedy films
1980s high school films
1980s science fiction comedy films
1980s teen comedy films
American action comedy films
American adventure comedy films
American high school films
American science fiction comedy films
American teen comedy films
Films about time travel
Touchstone Pictures films
Teen science fiction films
1980s English-language films
1980s American films